Jet ski at the 2008 Asian Beach Games were held from 23 October to 25 October 2008 in Bali, Indonesia.

Medalists

Medal table

Results

Runabout open
23–24 October

Runabout 800 superstock
23–24 October

Runabout endurance open
25 October

Ski open
23–24 October

References
 Official site
 www.ijsba.com

2008 Asian Beach Games events